Gunaga Vijayaditya III (848 – 892 AD)  was the most powerful king of the Vengi kingdom. His military victories brought a large portion of the Deccan under his control. He was a valuable ally of the Rashtrakuta emperor Amoghavarsha I, and after Amoghavarsha's death, he proclaimed independence. He took several titles like Gunaga, Gunage-Nallata, Parachakra Rama, Vallabha, etc.

Reign
His reign began with an expedition under his talented general Pandaranga to crush the Boya-Kottamas, a sturdy race of warriors who inhabited the northern borders of the Pallava kingdom (present-day Nellore district). His army captured the rebel strongholds of Kottama and Nellore. General Pandaranga was made governor of the annexed territory with his headquarters at Kandukur. They also captured the territory of a chief named Rahana. 

Gunaga Vijayaditya III, unlike his predecessors, maintained friendly relations with the Rashtrakuta emperor Amoghavarsha I and was sent to Gangavadi to crush the rebellion of the Western Gangas and other rebellious vassals. Vijayaditya bided his time until Amoghavarsha's death, and established independence. He defeated and pursued Krishna II, the successor of Amoghavarsha, till Chedi in central India. He defeated the Chedis of Tripuri, who had allied themselves with the Rashtrakutas. Vijayaditya III patronised Jainism, which was popular among the masses.

References

Eastern Chalukyas
 Telugu monarchs